The Maple Valley Public School District (MVSD #4 or MVPSD) is a public school district in Barnes and Cass counties in the U.S. state of North Dakota, based in Tower City. It also serves Buffalo, Fingal, and Oriska.

Schools
The school district was initially created with the merger of the Buffalo Public School and Tower City Public School after the 1975 school year.  Fingal Public School would merge with the new district starting the 1980 school year and Oriska would later join to create the Maple Valley-Oriska School District in 2001, but eventually fully consolidating as the Maple Valley Public School District for the 2002-2003 school year.

The Maple Valley Public School District operated with two elementary schools: one in Oriska and one in Buffalo with a high school facility in Tower City from the 2001 school year until the fall of 2018. Fingal originally hosted an elementary school as well up until the spring of 2000.

Starting in the fall of 2018, all district students were moved into one K-12 facility in Tower City through the gymnasium in Oriska is still used for junior high and elementary athletics.

According to the North Dakota Department of Public Instruction, the school district's enrollment totaled at 214 students for grades Kindergarten through 12th Grade for the 2018–2019 school year.

Athletics & Activities 
Partnering with the North Dakota High School Activities Association, the school district offers the following activities sponsored by the individual district:  Girls Volleyball, Girls Basketball, Boys Basketball, Vocal/Instrumental Music, One Act Play.  The district partners with Enderlin Public Schools to offer Football, Baseball, Boys Golf, Girls Golf, Softball, Boys Track & Field, Girls Track & Field, and Speech.  The district partners with Valley City Public Schools to sponsor Boys Cross Country, Girls Cross Country, and Wrestling.  The district also works with Jamestown Public Schools to offer Boys Ice Hockey.

Through their individual sports and activities, the teams are known as the "Raiders" with school colors consisting of Royal Blue, Red, and White.  When partnering with the Enderlin Public School, the teams are referred to as the "Enderlin/Maple Valley Falcons" with colors of Red, Black, and White.

The school is also home to the unofficial North Dakota Class B leading scorer in the history of North Dakota Girls Basketball, Rylee Nudell, who finished her high school career with 3,458 points and also holds the state rebounding record for ND Girls Basketball with 1,761 career rebounds.

References

Further reading
  - Clipping at Newspapers.com - Editorial about the North Dakota Superintendent of Public Instruction denying an expansion of the high school

External links

The official YouTube channel
 https://www.youtube.com/channel/UClnkBr7J8AY05MoRpno5Mag

School districts in North Dakota
Education in Barnes County, North Dakota
Education in Cass County, North Dakota
School districts established in 1975
1975 establishments in North Dakota